This is a list of schools in the Metropolitan Borough of Solihull, West Midlands, England.

State-funded schools

Primary schools

Balsall Common Primary School, Balsall Common
Bentley Heath CE Primary School, Bentley Heath
Berkswell CE Primary School, Berkswell
Bishop Wilson CE Primary School, Chelmsley Wood
Burman Infant School, Shirley
Castle Bromwich Infant School, Castle Bromwich
Castle Bromwich Junior School, Castle Bromwich
Cheswick Green Primary School, Cheswick Green
Coleshill Heath School, Chelmsley Wood
Coppice Junior School, Solihull
Cranmore Infant School, Shirley
Damson Wood Infant School, Solihull
Dickens Heath Community Primary School, Dickens Heath
Dorridge Primary School, Dorridge
Fordbridge Community Primary School, Chelmsley Wood
George Fentham Endowed School, Hampton in Arden
Greswold Primary School, Solihull
Haslucks Green School, Shirley
Hockley Heath Academy, Hockley Heath
Kineton Green Primary School, Olton
Kingshurst Primary School, Kingshurst
Knowle CE Primary Academy, Knowle
Lady Katherine Leveson CE Primary School, Temple Balsall
Langley Primary School, Olton
Marston Green Infant Academy, Marston Green
Marston Green Junior School, Marston Green
Meriden CE Primary School, Meriden
Mill Lodge Primary School, Shirley
Monkspath Junior & Infant School, Shirley
Oak Cottage Primary School, Solihull
Olton Primary School, Olton
Our Lady of Compassion RC Primary School, Solihull
Our Lady of the Wayside RC Primary School, Shirley
Peterbrook Primary School, Shirley
St Alphege CE Infant School, Solihull
St Alphege CE Junior School, Solihull
St Andrew's RC Primary School, Solihull
St Anne's RC Primary School, Chelmsley Wood
St Anthony's RC Primary School, Kingshurst
St Augustine's RC Primary school, Solihull
St George & St Teresa RC Primary School, Bentley Heath
St John the Baptist RC Primary School, Chelmsley Wood
St Margaret's CE Primary School, Olton
St Mary & St Margaret's CE Primary School, Castle Bromwich
St Patrick's CE Primary Academy, Earlswood
Sharmans Cross Junior School, Solihull
Shirley Heath Junior School, Shirley
Smith's Wood Primary Academy, Smith's Wood
Streetsbrook Infant Academy, Shirley
Tidbury Green School, Tidbury Green
Tudor Grange Primary Academy St James, Shirley
Tudor Grange Primary Academy Yew Tree, Solihull
Ulverley School, Solihull
Valley Primary, Solihull
Widney Junior School, Solihull
Windy Arbor Primary School, Chelmsley Wood
Woodlands Infant School, Shirley
Yorkswood Primary School, Kingshurst

Secondary schools 

Alderbrook School, Solihull
Arden Academy, Knowle
Grace Academy, Chelmsley Wood
Heart of England School, Balsall Common
John Henry Newman Catholic College, Chelmsley Wood
Langley School, Olton
Light Hall School, Shirley
Lode Heath School, Solihull
Lyndon School, Solihull
Park Hall Academy, Castle Bromwich
St Peter's Catholic School, Solihull
Smith's Wood Academy, Smith's Wood
Tudor Grange Academy, Kingshurst
Tudor Grange Academy, Solihull
WMG Academy for Young Engineers, Chelmsley Wood

Special and alternative schools 

Castlewood School, Castle Bromwich
Daylesford Academy, Smith's Wood
Forest Oak School, Smith's Wood
Hazel Oak School, Shirley
Merstone School, Smith's Wood
Reynald's Cross School, Olton
Solihull Alternative Provision Academy, Shirley
Springfield House Community Special School, Knowle*
Triple Crown Centre, Solihull

*This school is located in Solihull, but is for pupils from Birmingham.

Further education 
The Sixth Form College, Solihull
Solihull College

Independent schools

Primary and preparatory schools
Eversfield Preparatory School, Solihull
Ruckleigh School, Solihull

Senior and all-through schools
Kingswood School, Shirley
Solihull School, Solihull

Special and alternative schools 
The Island Project School, Meriden

References

Solihull
Schools in Solihull